James A. "Jay" Rasulo was the Senior Executive VP and CFO of The Walt Disney Company. On June 30, 2015, Christine McCarthy was announced as his successor. Prior to being appointed CFO, he was chairman of Walt Disney Parks and Resorts from October 2005 until December 2009 when he switched positions with Thomas O. Staggs. He was made the president of the theme park division in September 2002, replacing Paul Pressler.

Walt Disney Parks and Resorts comprises Disneyland Resort in California, Walt Disney World Resort in Florida, Tokyo Disney Resort, Disneyland Resort Paris and Hong Kong Disneyland Resort. In addition, Rasulo oversaw Disney Cruise Line, Walt Disney Imagineering, Walt Disney Creative Entertainment and Disney Regional Entertainment, which operated the ESPN Zone sports-themed restaurants.

In 2006 and 2007, Rasulo is serving a two-year term as national chair for the Travel Industry Association.  He also serves as chair of the U.S. Travel and Tourism Advisory Board, established in 2003 to advise the U.S. Department of Commerce, and is a director on the Department of Homeland Security's Safe Borders / Open Doors Committee.

Rasulo joined The Walt Disney Company in 1986 as a director within Corporate Strategic Planning and later rose to senior vice president, where he led development for Disney's real estate-based businesses. After two years as a senior vice president of Corporate Alliances and three years with Disney Regional Entertainment, Rasulo became executive vice president of Euro Disney S.C.A., which operates Disneyland Resort Paris. He served as president and chief operating officer before taking over as chairman and CEO of the French resort in 2000.

A native of New York, Rasulo has a degree in economics from Columbia University and an MA in economics and an MBA from the University of Chicago. Before joining Disney, he worked for Chase Manhattan Bank and the Marriott Corporation.

He serves on the boards of the Los Angeles Philharmonic Orchestra, the French-American Chamber of Commerce and the Los Angeles Jobs and Economy Commission.

References

Disney people
Columbia University alumni
University of Chicago Booth School of Business alumni
Living people
American chief operating officers
Year of birth missing (living people)